The Shop Boyz are an Atlanta-based rap group best known for their 2007 hit single "Party Like a Rockstar." The group is composed of Demetrius "Meany" Hardin, Richard "Fat" Stephens, Rasheed "Sheed" Hightower.

Career
After signing with Universal Republic Records, Shop Boyz began to record their first album, Rockstar Mentality, which featured rock-influenced hip hop. The album's lead single, "Party Like a Rockstar," was released in May 2007 and achieved commercial success, reaching number two on the US Billboard Hot 100 and becoming the highest-selling ringtone of 2007. Rockstar Mentality was released on June 19, 2007, debuting at number 11 on the US Billboard 200, which had sold 200,000 copies as of 2007. The follow-up single, "They Like Me", performed at number 98. The group was eventually released from Universal and moved to another label.

In August 2008, Shop Boyz released "Up Thru There" as the lead single from their second studio album.

Discography

Studio albums

Singles

Awards and nominations

BET Hip Hop Awards
2007: Best Track: "Party Like a Rockstar" (Won)

Grammy Awards
2008: Best Rap Performance by Duo or Group: "Party Like a Rockstar" (Nominated)

References

External links
Official website

Musical groups established in 2004
Musical groups disestablished in 2008
Musical groups from Atlanta
American musical trios
Republic Records artists
Southern hip hop groups
African-American musical groups
Rappers from Atlanta